Conquest (aka The Candle in the Wind) is a 1928 American aviation drama film, based on the short story Conquest by Mary Imlay Taylor.  The film was made using the Vitaphone sound process.

Conquest was directed by Roy Del Ruth, starring Monte Blue, H.B. Warner and Lois Wilson. The film is a melodrama about an aircraft crash in Antarctica.

Conquest is now considered a lost film.

Plot
Two pilots, James Farnham (H.B. Warner) and Donald Overton (Monte Blue) are in love with the same girl, Diane Holden (Lois Wilson ). Attempting to fly an aircraft to the South Pole, the pair run  into trouble, tumbling out of control, and crashing in the Antarctic wastelands. Donald's leg is broken, and is left to die by James, whose motives are suspect. He can now have Diane all to himself.

Rescued by the crew of a whaler, Donald is injured but survives. When he recovers, he vows vengeance on the man who left him to die. Returning home, James has proposed and marries Diane, Donald's former fiancée.

Now, scarred and crazed, Donald searches out Dianne and James. Donald persuades William Holden (Edmund Breese), Diane's father, the sponsor of the first flight, to finance another flight to Antarctica.

The same crew is resurrected but again the two pilots crash, and this time James is injured, unable to move because of a broken leg. Donald cannot bring himself to leave him, and together they make their way to safety.

On the way back to civilization, James asks Donald's forgiveness and then kills himself, freeing Donald to find happiness with Diane.

Cast

 Monte Blue as Donald Overton  
 H.B. Warner as James Farnham  
 Lois Wilson as Diane Holden  
 Edmund Breese as William Holden  
 Tully Marshall as Dr. Gerry

Production
Original pre-production work was on a film project entitled The Candle in the Wind, that was subsequently changed to Conquest. Highly influenced by public awareness of Antarctic aerial exploration by Rear Admiral Richard E. Byrd, Conquest was one of a number of aviation films about Antarctica flights, that were released, including With Byrd at the South Pole (1930) and The Lost Zeppelin (1929). Principal photography on Conquest began on July 30, 1928. To recreate the aircraft used on the Antarctic flight, an "elaborate full-scale Fokker tri-motor mockup" was constructed.

Reception
Aviation film historian Stephen Pendo, in Aviation in the Cinema (1985) characterized Conquest as a typical early "talkie" with a heavy reliance on dialogue, with as much as 70 percent of the film taken up by conversations.

Preservation status
Conquest is considered a lost film.

References

Notes

Citations

Bibliography

 Farmer, James H. Celluloid Wings: The Impact of Movies on Aviation (1st ed.). Blue Ridge Summit, Pennsylvania: TAB Books 1984. .
 Liebman, Roy. Vitaphone Films: A Catalogue of the Features and Shorts. Jefferson, North Carolina: McFarland, 2003. .
 Paris, Michael. From the Wright Brothers to Top Gun: Aviation, Nationalism, and Popular Cinema. Manchester, UK: Manchester University Press, 1995. .
 Pendo, Stephen. Aviation in the Cinema. Lanham, Maryland: Scarecrow Press, 1985. .

External links
 
 

1928 films
1928 drama films
American aviation films
Films directed by Roy Del Ruth
1920s English-language films
American black-and-white films
Warner Bros. films
Lost American films
1928 lost films
Lost drama films
1920s American films